Palmira Paola Loayza Rodríguez (born 24 March 1985) is a Bolivian futsal player and a footballer who played as a forward for the Bolivia women's national team.

International career
Loayza represented Bolivia at the 2004 South American U-19 Women's Championship. At senior level, she played the 2010 South American Women's Football Championship and the 2014 South American Games.

International goals
Scores and results list Bolivia's goal tally first

References

1985 births
Living people
Women's association football forwards
Bolivian women's footballers
Bolivia women's international footballers
Competitors at the 2014 South American Games
Club Aurora players
Bolivian women's futsal players